Van Hoy is a surname. Notable people with the surname include:

Cameron Van Hoy (born 1985), American actor, producer, director, and writer
Nikolaus van Hoy (1631–1679), Flemish Baroque painter

See also
Van Noy

Surnames of Dutch origin